The 1921 Bryson College Huskies football team was an American football team that represented the Bryson College of Fayetteville, Tennessee as an independent during the 1921 college football season, and they compiled a 2–5 record.

Schedule

References

Bryson College
Bryson College Huskies football